The Portman Building Society was a mutual building society in the United Kingdom, providing mortgages and savings accounts to consumers and offering loans to commercial enterprises. Its head office was in Bournemouth and its administration centre in Wolverhampton. Portman merged with the Nationwide Building Society in August 2007, at which time it was the third largest building society in the UK and the largest regional building society in the south of England, with 154 branches and assets exceeding £15 billion.

History

1846–1900: Origins

Portman Chapel Temperance Permanent Benefit Building Society was founded just around the corner from Manchester Square, London in 1881. Many of the founding members of the Society were also members of the Portman Chapel in nearby Baker Street, and this link was reinforced by using an image of the Chapel on the Society's crest. The first members to the Society included plumbers, booksellers' assistants and Solicitors' clerks.

By 1883, after 2 years in operation, the assets of the Society had multiplied more than fivefold to £30,927. 5s. 6d. This led the Society to invest in a premise of its own at 109 Crawford Street, London. By the 10th Annual report in 1890 the total assets of the Society had grown to £109,340. By 1900 the Society had advanced nearly half a million pounds in mortgages and its total assets had risen to £200,000.

1900–1930: Early growth and survival through World War 1

In 1902 the Society decided to move its offices to 415 Oxford Street as this was closer to Bond Street Station on the Central London Railway. By 1909 the Society had advanced £1 million in mortgages and decided to abbreviate its name to Portman Building Society.

Portman continued to lend at a high level during the first year of World War 1 but, like many other building societies, it went into limbo for the duration of the war and some years after. It wasn't until 1929 and the aftermath of the Wall Street Crash, that an inflow of funds came into the Society to increase its share capital by 25% to £1.5 million.

1930–1950: Connection with the West Country, World War 2 and new head office

By 1938 Portman had entered a joint agency with the Bridgewater and West of England Permanent Building Society, generating a regular flow of business from the West Country. The Second World War disrupted normal business and by the end of 1942, 18 members of the Society's staff were serving in the armed forces. The Society also contributed to the war effort by promoting the sale of Government Savings Certificates.

After the war Portman benefited from rising private house prices and the financing of sales from the private rented sector. By 1948 assets had grown to £6.6 million and the Society had moved into a new head office at 40 Portman Square, London.

1950–1980: New administration centre and merger with Bournemouth & Christchurch

Within 10 years, from 1950 to 1960, the Society increased its total assets from £8 million to £17.5 million. This growth was attributed to the general underlying demand for mortgages and investment accounts rather than the introduction of any new products.

1962 saw the Society complete the rebuilding of its head office at 40 Portman Square, London. With aspirations to become a national force among building societies, the Society was also expanding in other areas. The board decided to build an administration centre in the middle of Bournemouth, an eight-storey office block towering 200 ft. above Richmond Hill. This new centre was named 'Portman House' and housed routine administration departments and it also included a branch office. Upon opening, 28 senior staff decided to move from London and were later joined by the staff of the local branch. Further recruitment took place in Bournemouth, adding a further 42 members to the staff.
The new administration centre was opened by Admiral of the Fleet, the Lord Mountbatten of Burma.

In 1970 Portman appointed a new General Manager, John Heard. He had plans to improve the technology used in the Society and expand the branch network. A new computer system was duly installed at Portman House and 4 new branches opened in the year. By the end of 1971, Portman's total assets had increased to £62 million.

In 1975 at a special general meeting, 90% of the members of the Bournemouth and Christchurch Building Society voted in favour of a merger with Portman. This would be the Society's first acquisition, increasing its total assets to £100 million. The expansion of branches also continued apace – by 1978 the network numbered 29 with the aim to reach 50 by 1981.

1980–2006: Innovation and growth

In 1983 the Society started to introduce new products such as Flexi-Plus and Premium Share. Both accounts provided returns well above the rate of inflation. The Society needed more funds to cope with the increasing levels of demand for mortgages as the housing market gathered steam. By the end of the same year the Society's assets grew to over £337 million.

The Society introduced another new account, the Gold Seal account, which attracted substantial deposits and contributed to another record year which saw the Society's assets rise by 21% to £409 million in 1984.

In 1985 John Heard retired as General Manager. During his 15 years at the helm, the Society had increased its assets to over £400 million and expanded the branch network from 14 to 45 branches.

In line with 1986 Building Society Act, Portman was appointed the representative of the Scottish Life Assurance company in 1987 and introduced two new insurance products. 'Homeguard' (Buildings and contents insurance) and 'Loancover' (Personal accident, sickness and unemployment protection plan). In 1988 the Society continued expanding its insurance products, by offering Travel insurance, Drives Motor Car Policy and Thomas Cook traveller's cheques.

Expansion also continued through mergers. In July 1989, Wessex Building Society gave its approval to merge with Portman and the Society officially changed its name to Portman Wessex Building Society. This merger boosted the Society's worth to £1 billion. The following year saw another significant amalgamation when the Society merged with Regency & West of England Building Society. This merger took effect from October 1990, with 95% of members from both Societies approving of the move. The enlarged Society now had over 100 branches and its assets totalled £2.25 billion; its name reverted to Portman Building Society. This merger also brought in the Ramsbury Building Society, originally formed as the Provident Union Building and Investment Society, Ramsbury. This Society's history could be traced back to 1846 and it had been part of Regency & West of England since 1985.

The mergers continued throughout the 1990s. In 1993, the St Pancras Building Society with 5 branches and £90 million assets became part of the Portman. In 1997, the Greenwich Building Society with 7 branches and £176 million of assets merged with Portman.  These mergers helped the Society to grow in a buoyant south of England economy making the Society the UK 6th largest building society. In 1997, the Society also decided to demolish Portman House and invest £30 million in the construction of a new head office to meet its administration needs. This head office was opened in 2001 and would accommodate about 650 members of staff who worked in many different disciplines ranging from the call centre to information technology and estate management.

In 2001 the Society announced the acquisition of Sun Bank, later to be called The Mortgage Works, which offered specialist mortgage products focusing on the rental market.

In 2003 the Society merged with the Staffordshire Building Society. This prompted a new model for product distribution as the Staffordshire branches kept their name but sold Portman products and services.

Timeline
 1846 Provident Union Building Society is established in Ramsbury, Wiltshire.
 1881 Portman Chapel Temperance Permanent Benefit Building Society is founded in London.
 1989 31 July – Wessex Building Society agreed for the transfer of engagements to Portman Building Society and the Society officially changed its name to Portman Wessex Building Society
 1990 1 October – The Portman Wessex Building Society merges with the Regency & West of England Building Society and the Society reverted to its original name of Portman Building Society
 1993 Portman merges with the St. Pancras Building Society.
 1997 Portman merges with the Greenwich Building Society.
 2001 Portman acquires Sun Bank, a specialist mortgage lender.
 2003 Portman merges with Staffordshire Building Society, and both are re-branded.
 2004 Sun Bank changes its name to The Mortgage Works.
 2006 Portman merges with Lambeth Building Society.
 2006 Portman and Nationwide Building Society announce their merger intentions.
 2007 Portman and Nationwide complete their merger, with Nationwide the successor entity.

Merger with Nationwide Building Society
On 12 September 2006, the society announced plans to merge with the Nationwide Building Society, creating a mutual body with assets of more than £150 billion. The merger became effective at the end of August 2007.

Portman Members Against the Takeover, a protest group created against the merger, argued that "there is nothing wrong with Portman; it can exist on its own", and cited loss of jobs, customer service and members' interests as reasons that the merger should not go ahead. The campaign attracted significant media attention. Bournemouth Counciller Ron Whittaker, himself a Portman account holder, appealed to Portman members to vote against the merger and "not to be taken in by handouts", in reference to the windfall offered. Financial observers questioned the benefits of a merger (describing it as more akin to a takeover) citing issues such as job losses, less competitive rates and lower service standards as disadvantages.

Just months prior to the announcement of merger plans, Portman executive directors had argued that the interests of Portman members would be best served by it remaining an independent mutual building society. As part of the merger tender presented by Nationwide, Portman executive directors were offered the incentive of higher paid jobs on the board of the Nationwide should the planned merger take place. Portman executive directors had further personal interest in the merger being approved as a large portion of their bonuses were dependent on the merger being completed, a fact that was omitted from the merger booklet provided to Portman members and not disclosed until after the merger votes had been submitted. Merger information presented to voters suggested that they should vote in favour of the proposed merger, advice in direct contrast to that expressed by the same Portman board before they had received Nationwide's incentive-laden offer.

The merger was overwhelmingly endorsed by members at the society's AGM on 23 April 2007. After the Financial Services Authority (FSA) endorsed the members' decision on 26 July 2007, the society became part of the Nationwide on 28 August 2007. When the merger was announced it was anticipated that it would result in 900 redundancies.

Portman chief executive Robert Sharpe received a golden handshake of £1.7m and a pension worth £152,000 per year. He subsequently became chief executive of West Bromwich Building Society.

References

Banks established in 1846
Organizations established in 1846
Banks disestablished in 2007
Companies based in Wolverhampton
Companies based in Bournemouth
1846 establishments in the United Kingdom